Staroye Tataurovo is a rural locality (a selo) in Pribaykalsky District, Republic of Buryatia, Russia. The population was 992 as of 2010. There are 8 streets.

Geography 
Staroye Tataurovo is located 24 km southwest of Turuntayevo (the district's administrative centre) by road. Burdukovo is the nearest rural locality.

References 

Rural localities in Okinsky District